Milan Osterc (born 4 July 1975) is a Slovenian former professional footballer who played as a forward.

Club career
Osterc started his career at Veržej, where he was the top goalscorer of the 1993–94 Slovenian Second League season. In the 2001–02 UEFA Cup, he reached the quarter-finals of the competition with Hapoel Tel Aviv, scoring seven goals in the process. In the 2009–10 season, he was the top scorer of the Slovenian first division, 1. SNL, with 23 goals.

International career
Osterc played 44 matches for Slovenia and was a participant at the Euro 2000 and 2002 FIFA World Cup. On 10 November 2001 he scored a goal against Romania in the FIFA World Cup qualifying play-offs, helping to secure his country's first-ever World Cup appearance as an independent country.

International goals
Scores and results list Slovenia's goal tally first, score column indicates score after each Osterc goal.

Honours
Olimpija
Slovenian Cup: 1999–2000

Hapoel Tel Aviv
Toto Cup: 2001–02

See also
Slovenian international players

References

External links 
 
 Player profile at NZS 

1975 births
Living people
People from Murska Sobota
Slovenian footballers
Association football forwards
Slovenian expatriate footballers
NK Beltinci players
ND Gorica players
Hércules CF players
NK Olimpija Ljubljana (1945–2005) players
Hapoel Tel Aviv F.C. players
Le Havre AC players
Bursaspor footballers
Malatyaspor footballers
AEK Larnaca FC players
LASK players
FC Koper players
Slovenian Second League players
Slovenian PrvaLiga players
Segunda División players
Segunda División B players
Israeli Premier League players
Ligue 1 players
Süper Lig players
Cypriot First Division players
2. Liga (Austria) players
Expatriate footballers in Spain
Expatriate footballers in Israel
Expatriate footballers in France
Expatriate footballers in Turkey
Expatriate footballers in Cyprus
Expatriate footballers in Austria
Slovenian expatriate sportspeople in Spain
Slovenian expatriate sportspeople in Israel
Slovenian expatriate sportspeople in France
Slovenian expatriate sportspeople in Turkey
Slovenian expatriate sportspeople in Cyprus
Slovenian expatriate sportspeople in Austria
UEFA Euro 2000 players
2002 FIFA World Cup players
Slovenia youth international footballers
Slovenia under-21 international footballers
Slovenia international footballers